Qazi Hussain is the name of:

 Qazi Hussain Ahmad (1938–2013), president of the Islamist political party in Pakistan
 Qazi Anwar Hussain (born 1936), Bangladeshi writer
 Qazi Mahbub Hussain (died 2006), Bangladeshi writer
 Qazi Altaf Hussain (1920–1999), British Indian Army and Pakistan Army officer
 Qazi Massarrat Hussain (1936–2021), Pakistani Olympic hockey player
 Qazi Zafar Hussain (died 1968), Indian Muslim imam and scholar